Middle Harbour was an electoral district for the Legislative Assembly in the Australian state of New South Wales, named after Middle Harbour, Sydney and was originally created in the 1904 re-distribution of electorates following the 1903 New South Wales referendum, which required the number of members of the Legislative Assembly to be reduced from 125 to 90. It consisted of part of the abolished seat of Warringah with the balance of Warringah going to St Leonards. In 1920, with the introduction of proportional representation, it was absorbed into North Shore. It was recreated in 1988, replacing Willoughby, and abolished in 1991, being replaced by Willoughby.

Members for Middle Harbour

Election results

References

Former electoral districts of New South Wales
Constituencies established in 1904
1904 establishments in Australia
Constituencies disestablished in 1920
1920 disestablishments in Australia
Constituencies established in 1988
1988 establishments in Australia
Constituencies disestablished in 1991
1962 disestablishments in Australia